Francisco Jezuíno Avanzi (30 January 1949 – 8 October 2008), best known as Chicão, was a Brazilian association football player in defensive midfielder role. He was born in Piracicaba, São Paulo State.

In his career (1968–1985) he played for several clubs: XV de Piracicaba, União Barbarense, São Bento, Ponte Preta, São Paulo FC, Atlético Mineiro, Santos FC, Londrina, Corinthians Presidente Prudente, Botafogo-SP and Mogi Mirim.
 
He won one São Paulo State League (1975), one Brazilian League (1977) and one Minas Gerais State League (1980). For the Brazil national football team he got nine international caps, from February 1976 to August 1979, never scored a goal, and was on their roster for 1978 FIFA World Cup, playing in three games.

He died in October 2008 from cancer in São Paulo.

References

External links

1949 births
2008 deaths
People from Piracicaba
Brazilian footballers
Campeonato Brasileiro Série A players
Clube Atlético Mineiro players
Botafogo Futebol Clube (SP) players
Goiás Esporte Clube players
Mogi Mirim Esporte Clube players
Associação Atlética Ponte Preta players
Santos FC players
Esporte Clube São Bento players
São Paulo FC players
Esporte Clube XV de Novembro (Piracicaba) players
União Agrícola Barbarense Futebol Clube players
Londrina Esporte Clube players
Association football midfielders
1978 FIFA World Cup players
1979 Copa América players
Brazil international footballers
Footballers from São Paulo (state)